Pseudabispa is an Australian and Papuan genus of potter wasps containing 5 species, one of them (Pseudabispa bicolor) subdivided in 4 subspecies.

References

 van der Vecht, J. 1960. On Abispa and some other Eumenidae from the Australian region (Hymenoptera, Vespoidea). Nova Guinea (Zoology) 6: 91–115.
 Giordani Soika, A. 1977. Contributo alla conoscenza degli Eumenidi australiani (Hymenoptera). Memorie della Società Entomologica Italiana. Genova 55: 109–138.
 Borsato, W. & Ratti, E. 1999. Antonio Giordani Soika (1913–1997): la produzione scientifica. Memorie della Società Entomologica Italiana. Genova 77: 43–103

Biological pest control wasps
Potter wasps
Hymenoptera genera